The following are lists of extremes among the known exoplanets. The properties listed here are those for which values are known reliably. It is important to note that the study of exoplanets is one of the most dynamic emerging fields of science, and these values may change wildly as new discoveries are made.

Extremes from Earth's viewpoint

Planetary characteristics

Orbital characteristics

Stellar characteristics

System characteristics

See also
 Extremes on Earth
 Lists of exoplanets
 List of exoplanet firsts
 List of stars with proplyds
 Methods of detecting exoplanets
 List of potentially habitable exoplanets

References

External links
 WiredScience, Top 5 Most Extreme Exoplanets, Clara Moskowitz, 21 January 2009

Planetary extremes
Extrasolar planet extremes
Extrasolar planet extremes
Extremes
exoplanets